British Soldier may refer to:
A member of the British Armed Forces, particularly the British Army
The lichen Cladonia cristatella, a type of cup lichen commonly known as "British Soldiers"